French Fried Comedy is an English language comedy resource in Paris, France.

Background
Created in 2009 by American actor Robert Hoehn, French Fried Comedy produces web videos on its YouTube channel and stand-up comedy in English shows namely French Fried Comedy Night, as well as promotion of other English stand-up comedy shows.

French Fried TV started producing web videos in 2009, gaining recognition in particular for a video entitle "Sh#t French People Say", which was diffused on "L'Oeil de Links" a French television show on Canal+.

French Fried Comedy Night, is English stand-up comedy in Paris, first produced at LE PANAME ART CAFE in 2012 and continues there every Tuesday night. Other live show's include French Fried Open Mic, and the French Fried Comedy Brunch which claims more than 150 shows performing to over 10,000 spectators.

French Fried Comedy Night uses a showcase format, as opposed to a headline format like most stand-up shows. A show will consist of between five and seven comedians performing sets of roughly 5/10 minutes each. International special guests comics are often invited to perform.

In August 2015, French Fried Comedy performed at the PBH Free Fringe Festival part of the larger The Edinburgh Fringe Festival.  In 2016, the group performed as part of the Paris Fringe Festival.

References

External links
French Fried Comedy website

Comedy web series
Live stand-up comedy shows
French web series